In computer programming, code bloat is the production of program code (source code or machine code) that is perceived as unnecessarily long, slow, or otherwise wasteful of resources. Code bloat can be caused by inadequacies in the programming language in which the code is written, the compiler used to compile it, or the programmer writing it. Thus, while code bloat generally refers to source code size (as produced by the programmer), it can be used to refer instead to the generated code size or even the binary file size.

Examples
The following JavaScript algorithm has a large number of redundant variables, unnecessary logic and inefficient string concatenation.

// Complex 
function TK2getImageHTML(size, zoom, sensor, markers) {
    var strFinalImage = "";
    var strHTMLStart = '<img src="';
    var strHTMLEnd = '" alt="The map"/>';    
    var strURL = "http://maps.google.com/maps/api/staticmap?center=";
    var strSize = '&size='+ size;
    var strZoom = '&zoom='+ zoom;
    var strSensor = '&sensor='+ sensor;    
   
    strURL += markers[0].latitude;
    strURL += ",";
    strURL += markers[0].longitude;
    strURL += strSize;
    strURL += strZoom;
    strURL += strSensor;
    
    for (var i = 0; i < markers.length; i++) {
        strURL += markers[i].addMarker();
    }
    
    strFinalImage = strHTMLStart + strURL + strHTMLEnd;
    return strFinalImage;
};

The same logic can be stated more efficiently as follows:

// Simplified 
const TK2getImageHTML = (size, zoom, sensor, markers) => {
    const [ { latitude, longitude } ] = markers;
    let url = `http://maps.google.com/maps/api/staticmap?center=${ latitude },${ longitude }&size=${ size }&zoom=${ zoom }&sensor=${ sensor }`;

    markers.forEach(marker => url += marker.addMarker());

    return `<img src="${ url }" alt="The map" />`;
};

Code density of different languages 
 
The difference in code density between various computer languages is so great that often less memory is needed to hold both a program written in a "compact" language (such as a domain-specific programming language, Microsoft P-Code, or threaded code), plus an interpreter for that compact language (written in native code), than to hold that program written directly in native code.

Reducing bloat 
Some techniques for reducing code bloat include:
 Code refactoring a commonly used code sequence into a subroutine, and calling that subroutine from several locations, rather than copy and pasting the code at each of those locations (copy-and-paste programming).
 Re-using subroutines that have already been written (perhaps with additional parameters), rather than re-writing them again from scratch as a new routine.
 Combine Program analysis to detect bloated code, with Program transformation to remove bloated code.

See also 
 Dead code elimination
 Minimalism (computing)
 Muntzing
 Polymorphism (computer science)
 Software optimization
 Software bloat
 Lightweight software

References 

Software optimization
Software engineering folklore